"Bicycle" is a song by South Korean singer Chungha. It was released on February 15, 2021, through MNH and 88rising as the title track from Chungha's first Korean-language studio album, Querencia. It was originally scheduled to be released on January 4, 2021, however it was delayed after she was diagnosed with COVID-19. Musically, "Bicycle" incorporates R&B, trap and dance-pop beats developed with the introduction of the intense fuzz guitar, and expresses excitement and the feelings of overwhelming energy of the moment.

Background and release
On January 11, 2021, Chungha announced that her debut Korean-language studio album titled Querencia would be released on February 15, 2021. One day later, it was announced that "Bicycle" would be the title track for the upcoming album. The song is described as a R&B pop song that expresses the excitement and overwhelming energy.

On February 15, 2021, the single "Bicycle" was released via digital download and streaming, in conjunction with its accompanying music video.

Commercial performance
"Bicycle" debuted at number 38 on South Korean's Gaon Digital Chart for the chart issue dated February 14–20, 2021. The song debuted on Billboard World Digital Song Sales chart at number 11 on February 25, 2021.

Credits and personnel
Credits adapted from the description section of the music video and Melon.

 Lyrics by VINCENZO and Chungha
 Composed by Daniel Kim, Jeremy G (Future Sound) and Dawn Elektra
 Arranged by Daniel Kim and VINCENZO
 Instruments by Daniel Kim and VINCENZO
 Background vocals by Emily Yeonseo Kim and Dawn Elektra
 Directed by Fuxxy and VINCENZO
 Recorded by Jung Eunkyeng at Ingrid Studio
 Mixed by Yoon Wonkwon at Studio DDeepKick
 Mastered by Park Jung-Un at Honey Butter Studio

Accolades

Charts

Release history

References

2021 songs
2021 singles
Chungha songs
MNH Entertainment singles
Korean-language songs